Abony is a town in Pest County, Hungary.

Geography
The area is on the River Tisza's wide floodplain which approximates . Its rich black soil contains some sand.

History
There are some archaeological finds from the 7th and 8th centuries.
The village was part of the shire county of Szolnok in the 13th century.
In 1474, Balázs Magyar, his daughter Benigna Magyar and later her husband Pál Kinizsi owned the land.
In 1515, István Werbőczy was given the village as a donation. 
In 1552, it came under Turkish rule, and during the next century it suffered almost complete destruction.
At the beginning of the 18th century, the village's population was growing, and in 1748 became a small town.
On 25 January 1849, Mór Perczel led the Hungarian troops to win near Abony as part of the Hungarian War of Independence.

The jewish community
Jews lived in the city from the 18th century. The synagogue was established in 1756, and in 1788 the Jewish school was founded. In 1840, 912 Jews lived in the city.
In May 1944, a ghetto was established by order of the German army, where the Jews of the city and the surrounding area were concentrated. In June, ghetto Jews were deported in two transports to the Auschwitz extermination camp.

In literature
On 12 June 1847 Sándor Petőfi spent a night in the village pub on his way from Nagyszalonta (where he visited János Arany) to Budapest. It is  mentioned it in his Journey letters.

Lajos Abonyi, a writer who lived in Abony, recorded a famous folk-song "In Nagyabony there are only two towers" from Zoltán Kodály's Braggadocio. In the song Nagyabony means this village. There is another Nagyabony in Slovakia, called in Slovak . The song's tune is from Upper Hungary.

Economy
The local economy is mainly based on agriculture: most people are crop farmers, but some grow grapes and fruit.

Landmarks

 Lajos Abonyi Folk Museum and granary
 Harkányi Castle
 Synagogue
 Roman Catholic church
 United Reformed Church
 Talián family mausoleum
 Family seats: Kostyán, Lavatka, Szapáry, Kisvigyázó (castle), Vigyázó, Ajtay, Sivó, Teszáry

Famous people
 János Varga, (1939 – 2022 ), Olympic champion wrestler.
 Gyula Háy (1900 – 1975), dramatist and poet.
 Artúr Balogh (1866 – 1951), Hungarian lawyer, university professor, politician, and member of the Hungarian Academy of Sciences.
 László Endre (1895 - 1946), politician and Nazi collaborator
 Zoltán Mucsi (b. 1957 - ), actor
 László Földi (b. 1952 – ), politician
 Norbert Kállai (b. 1984 – ), footballer

International relations

Twin towns — sister cities
Abony is twinned with:
 Reci (Hungarian ), Romania

References

External links

  in Hungarian
 Street map 
 Aerial photographs of Abony
 Lajos Abonyi folk museum
 Abony at szeporszag.hu
 Abony at lap.hu
 The jewish community in Abony On JewishGen website.

Populated places in Pest County
Jewish communities destroyed in the Holocaust